The Bennecarrigan Free Church is a place of worship of the Free Church of Scotland in Kilmory, on the island of  Arran, Scotland. The church was built in 1893.

External links 
 The chapel on www.britishlistedbuildings.co.uk
 The chapel on Google Streetview

Churches completed in 1893
Churches in North Ayrshire
Free Church of Scotland